Sangowal  is a village in Kapurthala district of Punjab State, India. The village is administrated by a Sarpanch who is an elected representative of village as per the constitution of India and Panchayati raj (India).

Dhilwan, Nadala, Rayya-6, Kapurthala are nearest Taluks  and Kapurthala, Kartarpur, Jalandhar, Qadian are the nearby Cities to Sangowal. Kapurthala, Jalandhar, Tarn Taran and Amritsar are the nearby District Headquarters to the village.

Transport

Train 
Dhilwan Railway Station- 2 km, Beas Railway Station- 5 km, Baba Bakalaraya- 10 km and Hamira- 12 km are nearest railway stations to Sangowal however, Jalandhar City major railway station is 34  km away from the village.

Air
Raja Sansi airport:- 61 km, Pathankot airport:- 92 km, Ludhiana airport:- 94 km and Gaggal airport:- 137 km nearest airports are available to Sangowal village.

Air travel connectivity 
The closest airport to the village is Sri Guru Ram Dass Jee International Airport.

Villages in Kapurthala

References

External links
  Villages in Kapurthala
 Kapurthala Villages List

Villages in Kapurthala district